Sea Gypsies, Sea Gypsy, Sea Nomads and Sea Nomad may refer to:

Ethnography
 Sama-Bajau peoples, a collective name for several ethnic groups in the Philippines, Sabah, eastern Malaysia, Brunei, Indonesia, and parts of Sarawak
 Moken, an Austronesian ethnic group who maintain a nomadic, sea-based culture
 Orang laut, a group of Malay people living in the Riau Islands of Indonesia
 Tanka people, a Han ethnic sub-group that lives on boats in Southern China
 Urak Lawoi, coastal dwellers of Thailand
 Jalia Kaibarta, an aboriginal Indian fishermen tribe

Other uses
 Badjao: The Sea Gypsies, a 1957 film directed by Philippine National Artist Lamberto V. Avellana and starring Rosa Rosal and Tony Santos, Sr.
 The Sea Gypsies (1978 film), starring Robert Logan and Heather Rattray
 "Gypsies of the sea", Alexander Dumas' description of Catalans in The Count of Monte Cristo

See also
 Water tribe (disambiguation)
 "Ocean Gypsy", a song by Renaissance
 The Water Gipsies (disambiguation)